The 1946 season is the Crvena zvezda inaugural season in the existence of the club. The team played in the Yugoslav Basketball League.

Overview

Players

Squad information

Source

Competitions

Overall

Overview
Source

Belgrade Championship

Serbian State League

League table

Source: OKK Beograd

Matches

Yugoslav League

League table

Source: Yugoslav First Basketball League Archive, OKK Beograd

Matches

Source: KK Crvena zvezda History

Statistics

References

External links
 KK Crvena zvezda official website 

KK Crvena Zvezda seasons
Crvena zvezda